Waddington Glacier is a tributary glacier, 3 nautical miles (6 km) long, flowing west-northwest along the south side of Ugolini Peak, Colwell Massif, to enter Palais Glacier, Victoria Land. Named by Advisory Committee on Antarctic Names (US-ACAN) in 1994 after Edwin D. Waddington, geophysicist, University of Washington; from 1990, field investigator at Taylor Dome in an extended program of glacier geophysical studies.

Glaciers of Scott Coast